When It All Goes South is the nineteenth studio album by American country music band Alabama, released in 2001. It produced the singles "When It All Goes South", "Will You Marry Me" and "The Woman He Loves". This became Alabama's final studio album of original materials until 2015's Southern Drawl. It ranked at No. 37 in Billboard Album Charts and No. 4 on Country Album Chart.

Track listing

Personnel

Alabama
Jeff Cook- background vocals, electric guitar; lead vocals on "Wonderful Waste of Time"
Teddy Gentry- background vocals, bass guitar; lead vocals on "Love Remains"
Randy Owen- lead vocals, background vocals

Alabama's drummer, Mark Herndon, does not play on the album.

Additional Musicians
Tim Akers- keyboards
Jann Arden- vocals on "Will You Marry Me"
Eddie Bayers- drums
Dennis Burnside- B-3 organ, keyboards, piano
Trinecia Butler- background vocals
Larry Byrom- acoustic guitar, electric guitar
Rick Carnes- keyboards
Mark Casstevens- acoustic guitar
Christopher Cross- vocals on "Love Remains"
Dan Dugmore- steel guitar
Shannon Forrest- drums, percussion
Larry Franklin- fiddle, mandolin
Paul Franklin- steel guitar
Steve Gibson- electric guitar
Rick Hall- electric mandolin, percussion
Larry Hanson- electric guitar, trumpet
John Hobbs- keyboards, piano
Jim Horn- saxophone
John Barlow Jarvis- keyboards
Wayne Jackson - trumpet
Jeff King- electric guitar
Josh Leo- acoustic guitar, electric guitar
Andrew Love- tenor saxophone
Brent Mason- electric guitar
Mac McAnally- acoustic guitar
Chris McHugh- drums
Terry McMillan- harmonica, percussion
Jerry McPherson- bouzouki, electric guitar, electric sitar
Wendell Mobley- background vocals
Greg Morrow- drums, percussion
Steve Nathan- B-3 organ, keyboards, piano, synthesizer
James Nelson- saxophone
Floyd S. Newman- baritone saxophone
Jimmy Nichols- piano, synthesizer
Michael Omartian- piano, keyboards
Dean "Dino" Pastin- harmonica, keyboards, saxophone
Bob Patin- B-3 organ, keyboards, synthesizer, synth flute
Michael Rhodes- bass guitar
Tom Roady- percussion
Brent Rowan- electric guitar, electric sitar
John Wesley Ryles- background vocals
Scotty Sanders- steel guitar
Michael Severs- electric guitar
Cindy Shelton- background vocals
Brian D. Siewert- synth strings
Lisa Silver- background vocals
Jimmie Lee Sloas- bass guitar
Michael Spriggs- acoustic guitar
Don Srygley- electric guitar, percussion
James Stroud- drums
Harvey Thompson- tenor saxophone
Cindy Walker- background vocals
Christopher Walters- keyboards
Biff Watson- bouzouki, acoustic guitar
Glenn Worf- bass guitar  
Bob Wray - bass guitar

Voices on "I Write a Little" by Chris DeCarlo, Greg Fowler, Keith Gale, Sam Harrell, Adrian Michaels, Darcy Miller, Dan Nelson, Mike Siris, Suzette Tucker, and Mike Wilson; Military Advisor: LTC James (Jim) E. Pyle U.S. Army (Ret.)

Production
 Alabama (all tracks except "Love Remains" and "The Woman He Loves")
 Don Cook ("Wonderful Waste of Time", "I Write a Little", "Simple as That", "When It All Goes South")
 Josh Leo and Larry Michael Lee ("Right Where I Am", "I Can't Love You Any Less", "Clear Across America Tonight")
 James Stroud ("Will You Marry Me", "You Only Paint the Picture Once", "I Can't Hide My Heart")
 Rick Hall ("Reinvent the Wheel", "Start Living", "Down This Road")
 Michael Omartian and Teddy Gentry ("Love Remains")
 Teddy Gentry and Randy Owen ("The Woman He Loves")

Chart performance

Weekly charts

Year-end charts

Singles

References

2001 albums
RCA Records albums
Alabama (American band) albums